Sunland Park is a city in southern Doña Ana County, New Mexico, United States, on the borders of Texas and the Mexican state of Chihuahua, with Ciudad Juárez adjoining it on the south and El Paso, Texas on the east. The community of Santa Teresa adjoins it on the northwest. The population of Sunland Park was 14,106 at the 2010 census and was estimated at 17,978 by the United States Census Bureau in 2019. Though it lies adjacent to El Paso, being in Doña Ana County makes it a part of the Las Cruces metropolitan statistical area.

The city is at the foot of Mount Cristo Rey, next to the Rio Grande, and is named for Sunland Park Racetrack & Casino, which lies within the city limits. The location was formerly called "Anapra", a name shared by an adjacent area of Ciudad Juárez.

History
Sunland Park was formed when the unincorporated communities of Anapra, Sunland Park, and Meadow Vista voted to incorporate as Sunland Park on July 13, 1983.

2012 extortion scandal
In February 2012, then-Mayor Pro Tem Daniel Salinas and City Manager Jaime Aguilera were arrested and charged with extortion of mayoral candidate Gerardo Hernandez. Salinas and Aguilera allegedly tried to blackmail Hernandez into withdrawing from the race with a videotape of Hernandez receiving a lap dance in his campaign office.

An election for mayor was held in March 2012, with Daniel Salinas winning the mayor's office, but he was denied taking office due to extortion, bribery, and election fraud charges filed against him, which disqualified him from taking an oath of office.

Border barrier

A private organization, named We Build The Wall built a 1/2 mile wall on at the border of Sunland Park and Mexico in 2019. Privately financed using a GoFundMe campaign, the wall was built on private property but the gate they constructed blocked access needed to maintain a federal dam. The barrier also blocked access to Monument One, an official marker of the International Boundary and Water Commission that was set where New Mexico, Texas and the Mexican state of Chihuahua converge.

Geography

Demographics

As of the census of 2010, 14,267 people, 3,884 households, and 3,314 families resided in the city. The population density was 1,260.6 people per mi2 (486.6/km). The 4,131 housing units averaged 342.6 per mi2 (132.2/km). The racial makeup of the city was 76.00% White, 0.63% African American, 0.51% Native American, 0.2% Asian, 0.01% Pacific Islander, 26.02% from other races, and 2.76% from two or more races. Hispanics or Latinos of any race were 96.44% of the population.

Of the 3,884 households, 44.3% had children under the age of 18 living with them, 55% were married couples living together, 24% had a female householder with no husband present, and 11.5% were not families. About 12.6% of all households were made up of individuals, and 3.9% had someone living alone who was 65 years of age or older. The average household size was 3.63 and the average family size was 3.97.

In the city, the population was distributed as 37.5% under the age of 18, 11.9% from 20 to 24, 7.6% from 25 to 29, 6.6% from 45 to 64, and 7.5% who were 65 years of age or older. The median age was 28.8 years. For every 100 females, there were 93.5 males. For every 100 females age 18 and over, there were 88.4 males.

Government
On August 2, 2012, Javier Perea was reappointed as Mayor of Sunland Park. He began his official duties on April 18, 2012. At the urging of the State of New Mexico, the city conducted a search for the position of City Manager.

On December 17, 2013, Vernon Wilson was selected to fill the long-vacant position. He was a retired U.S. Army officer whose other government service included over 10 years as Manager of the nearby Dona Ana County International Jetport. His first day of employment was January 1, 2014.

Education
Sunland Park is served by the Gadsden Independent School District, which operates these schools located in the city:
Santa Teresa High School
Santa Teresa Middle School
Desert View Elementary School
Riverside Elementary School
Sunland Park Elementary School

Sunland Park also has a branch campus of Doña Ana Community College, a two-year college branch of New Mexico State University.

Infrastructure
Water is supplied by the Camino Real Regional Utility Authority.

Points of interest

Mt. Cristo Rey
Western Playland
Sunland Park Racetrack & Casino

References

Cities in Doña Ana County, New Mexico
Cities in New Mexico
New Mexico populated places on the Rio Grande
Mexico–United States border crossings